Farhat Nadeem Beg from the University of California, San Diego, was named Fellow of the Institute of Electrical and Electronics Engineers (IEEE) in 2012 for contributions to high intensity laser matter interactions and pulsed power pinches.

References 

Fellow Members of the IEEE
Living people
University of California, San Diego faculty
Engineers from California
Year of birth missing (living people)
Place of birth missing (living people)
American electrical engineers